Lassell may refer to:

Michael Lassell (born 1947), American writer and editor
William Lassell (1799–1880), English astronomer. Objects named after him include
2636 Lassell, a minor planet
 Lassell (lunar crater)
 Lassell (Martian crater) 
Mount Lassell in Antarctica